Sweden competed at the 1988 Winter Paralympics in Innsbruck, Austria. They obtained 3 gold metals, 7 silver metals, and 5 bronze medals.

See also 
 Sweden at the Paralympics
 Sweden at the 1988 Winter Olympics

References 

1988
1988 in Swedish sport
Nations at the 1988 Winter Paralympics